Daneshmand may refer to:

Daneshmand, Iran, a village in Golestan Province, Iran
Daneshmand (magazine), an Iranian general-science monthly
ST Daneshmand, originally Empire Sally, a UK-built Iranian tugboat

People with the surname
Bijan Daneshmand (born 1958), Iranian-born British actor